Van Diemen Gulf is a gulf in the Northern Territory of Australia. It connects to the Timor Sea in the north via Dundas Strait. Most of its area is also gazetted as a locality with the name Van Diemen Gulf.

History
The gulf was named after the Dutch colonial governor, Anthony van Diemen (1593–1645).

Phillip Parker King and his crew in the 76-tonne cutter  surveyed the coastline in early 1818, encountering local Aboriginal people and proas sailed by Makassans, and passed by the Gulf on other voyages.

Geography
The gulf connects to the Timor Sea in the north via Dundas Strait, and is also connected to the Beagle Gulf in the west by the Clarence Strait.

Rivers draining into the Gulf include the South Alligator River, the East Alligator River, the Mary River, Wildman River and the Adelaide River. The Kakadu National Park adjoins its south-east coast.

Administrative status 
On 4 April 2007, most of the area occupied by the Van Diemen Gulf was gazetted as a locality with the name Van Diemen Gulf by the Northern Territory Government, who also included it in the local government area of the West Arnhem Region.

References

Coastline of the Northern Territory
Gulfs of Australia
Maritime history of the Dutch East India Company
IMCRA meso-scale bioregions